Bey (/) is a Turkic title for a chieftain, and an honorific, traditionally applied to people with special lineages to the leaders or rulers of variously sized areas in the numerous Turkic kingdoms, emirates, sultanates and empires in Central Asia, South Asia, and the Middle East, such as the Ottomans, Timurids or the various khanates and emirates in Central Asia and the Eurasian Steppe. The feminine equivalent title was begum. The regions or provinces where "beys" ruled or which they administered were called beylik, roughly meaning "governorate" and/or "region" (the equivalent of county in other parts of Europe). However the exact scope of power handed to the beks (alternative spelling to beys) varied with each country, thus there was no clear-cut system, rigidly applied to all countries defining all the possible power and prestige that came along with the title.

Today, the word is still used formally as a social title for men, similar to the way the titles "sir" and "mister" are used in the English language. Additionally, it is widely used in the naming customs of Central Asia, namely in countries such as Uzbekistan, Tajikistan, Kazakhstan and Kyrgyzstan. Notably, the ethnic designation of Uzbeks comes from the name of Öz Beg Khan of the Golden Horde, being an example of the usage of this word in personal names and even names of whole ethnic groups. The general rule is that the honorific is used with first names and not with surnames or last names.

Etymology
The word entered English from Turkish bey, itself derived from Old Turkic beg, which – in the form bäg – has been mentioned as early as in the Orkhon inscriptions (8th century AD) and is usually translated as "tribal leader". The actual origin of the word is still disputed, though it is mostly agreed that it was a loan-word, in Old Turkic. This Turkic word is usually considered a borrowing from an Iranian language. However, German Turkologist Gerhard Doerfer assessed the derivation from Iranian as superficially attractive but quite uncertain, and pointed out the possibility that the word may be genuinely Turkic. Two principal etymologies have been proposed by scholars:

 the Middle Persian title bag (also baγ or βaγ, Old Iranian baga; cf. Sanskrit भग / bhaga) meaning "lord" and "master". Peter Golden derives the word via Sogdian bġy from the same Iranian root. All Middle Iranian languages retain forms derived from baga- in the sense "god": Middle Persian bay (plur. bayān, baʾān), Parthian baγ, Bactrian bago, Sogdian βγ-, and were used as honorific titles of kings and other men of high rank in the meaning of "lord". The Iranian bāy (through connection with Old Indian noun bhāgá "possessions, lot") gave Turkish word bai (rich), whence Mongol name Bayan (rich).
 the Chinese title pö (伯 Mandarin bó; its historical pronunciation being pök or pak or  perjk, as reconstructed Edwin Pulleyblank), meaning older brother and feudal lord.

What is certain is that the word has no connections to Turkish berk, "strong" (Mongolian berke), or Turkish bögü, "shaman" (Mong. böge).

Turkish and Azerbaijani beys

The first three rulers of the Ottoman realm were titled Bey. The chief sovereign of the Ottoman Empire came to be called sultan starting in 1383 when Murad I was granted this title by the shadow caliph in Cairo.

The Ottoman state had started out as one of a dozen Turkish Ghazi Beyliks, roughly comparable to western European duchies, into which Anatolia (i.e., Asian Turkey, or Asia Minor) had been divided after the break-up of the Seljuk Sultanate of Ikonion (Konya) and the military demise of the Byzantine Empire. Its capital was Bursa. By 1336, it had annexed the Beylik of Karasy, its western neighbour on the coast of the Sea of Marmara, and it began to expand quite rapidly thereafter.

As the Ottoman realm grew from a Beylik into an imperial sultanate, the title "Bey" came to be applied to subordinate military and administrative officers, such as a district administrator and lower-level minor military governors. The latter were usually titled Sanjak Bey (after the term "Sanjak", denoting a military horsetail banner). Beys were lower in rank than pashas and provincial governors (wālis, usually holding the title of pasha), who governed most of the Ottoman vilayets (provinces), but higher than effendis.

Eventually, the chiefs of the former Ottoman capitals Bursa and Edirne (formerly the Byzantine Adrianople in Thrace) both were designated "Bey".

Over time, the title became somewhat devalued, as Bey was used as a courtesy title for a pasha's son. It also came to be attached to officers and dignitaries below those entitled to be pashas, notably the following military officer ranks (still lower ranks were styled efendi):
Miralai (army colonel or navy captain)
Kaimakam (army lieutenant-colonel or navy commander)

Oddly, the compound Beyefendi was part of the title of the husband (full style Damad-i-Shahyari (given name) Beyefendi) and sons (full style Sultanzade (given name) Beyefendi) of an Imperial Princess, and their sons in turn were entitled to the courtesy title Beyzade, "Son of a Bey". For the grandsons of an imperial princess, the official style was simply Bey after the name.

By the late 19th century, "Bey" had been reduced in the Ottoman Empire to an honorary title. While in Qazaq and other Central Asian Turkic languages, бай [bɑj] remains a rather honorific title, in modern Turkish, and in Azerbaijan, the word "bey" (or "bay") simply means "mister" (compare Effendi) or "sir" and is used in the meaning of "chieftain" only in historical context. Bay is also used in Turkish in combined form for certain military ranks, e.g. albay, meaning colonel, from alay "regiment" and -bay, and yarbay, meaning lieutenant colonel, from yardim "assistance" and -bay (thus an "assistant albay").

Lucy Mary Jane Garnett wrote in the 1904 work Turkish Life in Town and Country that "distinguished persons and their sons" as well as "high government officials" could become bey, which was one of two "merely conventional designations as indefinite as our "Esquire" has come to be.[in the United Kingdom]".

The Republican Turkish authorities abolished the title circa the 1930s.

As with most Turkish titles, it follows the name rather than precedes it, e.g. "Ahmet Bey" for "Mr. Ahmet". When one speaks of Mr. Ahmet, the title has to be written with a capital (Ahmet Bey), but when one addresses him directly it is simply written without capital (Ahmet bey). Bey may combine with efendi to give a common form of address, to which the possessive suffix -(i)m is usually added: beyefendim, efendim.

Beyefendi has its feminine counterpart: hanımefendi , used alone, to address a woman without her first name. And with the first name: Ayşe Hanım or Ayşe hanım, for example, according to the rule given above about the use of the capital letter.

Beys elsewhere

The title bey was also called  or bek – from Turkish  – in North Africa, including Egypt.
A bey could maintain a similar office within Arab states that broke away from the High Porte, such as Egypt and Sudan under the Muhammad Ali Dynasty, where it was a rank below pasha (maintained in two rank classes after 1922), and a title of courtesy for a pasha's son.

Even much earlier, the virtual sovereign's title in Barbaresque North African 'regency' states was "Bey" (compare Dey).
Notably in Tunis, the Husainid Dynasty used a whole series of title and styles including Bey:

 Just Bey itself was part of the territorial title of the ruler, and also as a title used by all male members of the family (rather like Sultan in the Ottoman dynasty).
 Bey al-Kursi "Bey of the Throne", a term equivalent to reigning prince.
 Bey al-Mahalla "Bey of the Camp", title used for the next most senior member of the Beylical family after the reigning Bey, the Heir Apparent to the throne.
 Bey al-Taula "Bey of the Table", the title of the Heir Presumptive, the eldest prince of the Beylical family, who enjoyed precedence immediately after the Bey al-Mahalla.
 Beylerbeyi (or Beglerbegi) "Lord of Lords", was the administrative rank formally enjoyed by the ruler of Algiers and by rulers of parts of the Balkans in their official capacity of Ottoman Governor-General within the Turkish empire.This title was also used in Safavid empire.

Bey was also the title that was awarded by the Sultan of Turkey in the twilight of the Ottoman Empire to Oloye Mohammed Shitta, an African merchant prince of the Yoruba people who served as a ranking leader of the Muslim community in the kingdom of Lagos. Subsequently, he and his children became known in Nigeria by the double-barrelled surname Shitta-Bey, a tradition which has survived to the present day through their lineal descendants.

In the Ottoman period, the lords of the semi-autonomous Mani Peninsula used the title of beis (μπέης); for example, Petros Mavromichalis was known as Petrobey.

Other Beys saw their own Beylik promoted to statehood, e.g.:

 in Qusantina (Constantine in French), an Ottoman district subject to the Algiers regency since 1525 (had its own Beys since 1567), the last incumbent, Ahmed Bey ben Mohamed Chérif (b. c. 1784, in office 1826–1848, d. 1850), was maintained when in 1826 the local Kabyle population declared independence, and when it was on 13 October 1837 conquered by France, until it was incorporated into Algeria in 1848.

Bey or a variation has also been used as an aristocratic title in various Turkic states, such as Bäk in the Tatar Khanate of Kazan, in charge of a Beylik called Bäklek. The Uzbek Khanate of Khiva, Emirate of Bukhara and The Khanate of Kokand used the "beks" as local administrations of "bekliks" or provinces. The Balkar princes in the North Caucasus highlands were known as taubiy (taubey), meaning the "mountainous chief".

Sometimes a Bey was a territorial vassal within a khanate, as in each of the three zuzes under the Khan of the Kazakhs.

The variation Beg, Baig or Bai, is still used as a family name or a part of a name in South and Central Asia as well as the Balkans. In Slavic-influenced names, it can be seen in conjunction with the Slavic -ov/-ović/ev suffixes meaning "son of", such as in Bakir and Alija Izetbegović, Abai Kunanbaev.

The title is also used as an honorific by members of the Moorish Science Temple of America and the Moorish Orthodox Church.

'Bey' is also used colloquially in Urdu-speaking parts of India, and its usage is similar to "chap" or "man". When used aggressively, it is an offensive term.

See also

 Biy - a jugde and senator in Kazakh khanate
 Baig
 Begum
 Beylerbey
 Begzada
 Atabeg
 Dey
 Khagan Bek
 Skanderbeg
 Bai Baianai
 Anatolian beyliks
 Ottoman titles

References

External links

 "Bey" at Encyclopaedia of the Orient.

Gubernatorial titles
Heads of state
Military ranks
Noble titles of Egypt
Noble titles
Ottoman titles
Positions of subnational authority
Royal titles
Titles in Lebanon
Titles of national or ethnic leadership
Turkish titles
Turkish words and phrases
Titles in Bosnia and Herzegovina during Ottoman period